Molecular properties include the chemical properties, physical properties, and structural properties of molecules, including drugs. Molecular properties typically do not include pharmacological or biological properties of a chemical compound.

See also 
 Biological activity
 Chemical property
 Chemical structure
 Lipinski's rule of five, describing molecular properties of drugs
 Physical property
 QSAR, quantitative structure-activity relationship

References 

Physical quantities
Molecules